Lithoxus boujardi is a species of armored catfish endemic to French Guiana where it occurs in the Approuague and Oyapock River basins.  L. boujardi frequents fast flowing waters of rivers and creeks with a rock or sand substrate.  This species grows to a length of  SL.

References 

 

Ancistrini
Fish of South America
Fish of French Guiana
Endemic fauna of French Guiana
Fish described in 1993